State Route 79 (SR 79) was a state highway in Storey and Lyon counties in Nevada. Also known as Six Mile Canyon Road, the highway was an  road connecting Virginia City to U.S. Route 50 (US 50) near Dayton.
Six Mile Canyon, along with nearby Gold Canyon, was the site of some of the state’s first mining efforts and earliest encampments.

References 

079
Transportation in Storey County, Nevada
Transportation in Lyon County, Nevada